Gods of Egypt is a 2016 fantasy action film directed by Alex Proyas based on a fantastical version of some ancient Egyptian deities. It stars Nikolaj Coster-Waldau, Brenton Thwaites, Chadwick Boseman, Élodie Yung, Courtney Eaton, Rufus Sewell, Gerard Butler, and Geoffrey Rush. The film portrays the Egyptian god Horus who partners with a mortal Egyptian thief, on a quest to rescue his love, and to save the world from Set.

Filming took place in Australia under the film production and distribution company Summit Entertainment in conjunction with Thunder Road Pictures and Proyas' production company Mystery Clock Cinema. While the film's production budget was  the parent company Lionsgate's financial exposure was less than $10 million due to tax incentives and pre-sales. The Australian government provided a tax credit for 46% of the film's budget. When Lionsgate began promoting the film in November 2015, it received backlash for its predominantly white cast playing Egyptian deities. In response, Lionsgate and director Proyas apologized for ethnically inaccurate casting.

It received negative reviews from critics and grossed a total of $150 million against a $140 million budget, becoming a box office bomb and losing the studio up to $90 million. It received five nominations at the 37th Golden Raspberry Awards.

Plot
In an alternative ancient Egypt where the gods live among the mortals, King Osiris is killed by his jealous brother Set during the coronation of Osiris's son Horus. Set then defeats Horus and takes his eyes, proclaiming himself the new king and commanding mankind to pay riches to pass into the afterlife.

One year later, with most of Egypt enslaved by Set, Zaya, a slave to Set's chief architect Urshu, gives plans for Set's pyramid to her lover, Bek. Using them, Bek infiltrates Set's treasure vault and steals one of Horus's eyes, but he and Zaya are caught by Urshu, who kills Zaya as she and Bek escape. Bek takes her body to the exiled Horus along with the eye, promising to help find the other if he brings Zaya back from the dead.

They visit the divine vessel of Horus's grandfather Ra. Neutral about the conflict with Set, and at war with the shadow beast Apophis that threatens to devour the world, Ra does not restore Horus's power, but allows him to take a vial of divine waters to weaken Set. Ra explains that Horus's loss of his powers is the result of not fulfilling his destiny, which Horus believes means avenging his parents' deaths.

Set asks Hathor to take him to the underworld, but she refuses and joins up with Bek and Horus. They hatch a plan to infiltrate Set's pyramid, recruiting Thoth to solve the riddle of the guardian sphinx. Overcoming the pyramid's entryway and the sphinx's riddle, they reach the source of Set's power. Before they can use the divine water, they are ambushed by Set, who destroys the divine water and takes Thoth's brain, but Horus saves Hathor and Bek. Hathor calls on Anubis to take Bek to the underworld and offers her bracelet as Zaya's payment for passage to the afterlife, sacrificing herself as doing so exiles her to the underworld.

Absorbing Thoth's brain, Osiris's heart, Horus's eye and wings from Nephthys, Set confronts Ra aboard his solar barge. Ra explains Set's mistreatment were tests to prepare him to take Ra's place as defender of the world against Apophis. Dismayed, Set decides to destroy the afterlife to become immortal, using his new powers to overpower Ra. Taking Ra's spear and casting him off the barge, Set frees Apophis to consume the mortal and underworld realms.

As Apophis attacks the gates to the afterlife are closed. Zaya, having refused Hathor's gift for not wanting an afterlife without Bek, encourages Bek to return to the mortal world and help Horus stop Set. As Horus battles Set atop an obelisk, Bek defeats and kills Urshu, before removing Horus's other eye from Set's armor, mortally wounding himself in the process and falling from the great height. Regaining his power to transform, Horus saves Bek from falling over retrieving his eye and flies him to safety, realizing that his true destiny was to protect his people. With renewed strength, Horus outmaneuvers and kills Set. Finding Ra wounded in the aether, Horus returns his spear, allowing Ra to repel Apophis and Anubis to reopen the gates.

A child returns Horus's other eye and the god lays a dying Bek in Osiris's tomb beside Zaya. For his deeds, Ra offers to bestow Horus with any power, Horus asks that Bek and Zaya be brought back to life. Ra grants his wish and the other gods are restored, except Horus's parents, who had already passed into the afterlife. Horus is crowned king and declares access to the afterlife will be paid with good deeds in life. Bek is made chief advisor and gives Horus Hathor's bracelet; Horus leaves to rescue her from the underworld.

Cast

In addition: Rachael Blake plays Isis, the wife of Osiris; Emma Booth plays Nephthys, sister of Isis and wife of Set; and Lindsay Farris provides as the voice of an older Bek, who narrates the film.

Production

Development

Gods of Egypt is directed by Alex Proyas based on a screenplay by Matt Sazama and Burk Sharpless. The film was produced under Summit Entertainment. Proyas was contracted by Summit in May 2012, to write the screenplay with Sazama and Sharpless, and to direct the film. Proyas said he sought to make a big-budget film with an original premise, to contrast franchise films. The director cited the following films as influences on Gods of Egypt: The Guns of Navarone (1961), Lawrence of Arabia (1962), The Man Who Would Be King (1975), Raiders of the Lost Ark (1981), and Sergio Leone's Western films. Lionsgate anticipated that Gods of Egypt would be the first film in a new franchise after it finished releasing The Hunger Games films.

Casting
Actor Nikolaj Coster-Waldau was cast in June 2013. Gerard Butler, Geoffrey Rush, and Brenton Thwaites joined the cast toward the end of 2013. Chadwick Boseman and Élodie Yung joined the cast at the start of 2014.

Filming
The film was shot in Australia. A crew of 200 began pre-production in Sydney in New South Wales, and producers considered filming in Melbourne in Victoria, to take advantage of the state's tax incentive. Docklands Studios Melbourne was too booked to accommodate Gods of Egypt, and producers were instead offered an airport facility for production. The Australian states New South Wales and Victoria competed to be the location of the film's production, and Summit selected NSW in February 2014. The state's deputy premier, Andrew Stoner, estimated that the production would add 400 jobs to the state and contribute  million to its economy.

The setting of Anubis' temple was filmed at Centennial Park in Sydney, and visual effects were laid over the scene. Jon Feltheimer, the CEO of Summit's parent company Lionsgate, said Lionsgate's financial exposure was under  due to tax incentives of filming in Australia, as well as foreign pre-sales. The Australian government's tax credit to have the film produced in the country covered 46% of the  production budget, and most of the remaining budget was covered by the foreign pre-sales.

Proyas used forced perspective and motion control photography to portray the difference in height between the actors portraying the gods and the humans. Proyas called the logistical challenge a "reverse Hobbit", referring to The Lord of the Rings films, in which Hobbits are depicted as shorter than humans. For the Sphinx, actor Kenneth Ransom portrayed the giant creature via motion capture. For the god Thoth, who can appear as many copies, actor Chadwick Boseman was filmed hundreds of times from different angles. For a scene with many copies of Thoth, other actors took a day to film the scene, where Boseman filmed the scene for three days.

Music
Composer Marco Beltrami, who scored Proyas's previous films Knowing (2009) and I, Robot (2004), returned to score Gods of Egypt.

Racial and ethnic casting
The film drew criticism due to the fact that none of the main actors were of Egyptian descent. White actors, predominantly of northwestern European descent, make up most of the principal cast of Gods of Egypt. When Lionsgate began marketing the film, the Associated Press said the distributor received backlash for ethnically inaccurate casting. Lionsgate and director Alex Proyas both issued apologies. The AP said, "While some praised the preemptive mea culpa... others were more sceptical, concluding that it's simply meant to shut down any further backlash."

The casting practice of white actors as Ancient Egyptian characters was first reported after filming started in March 2014, when Daily Lifes Ruby Hamad highlighted the practice as "Hollywood whitewashing". Lionsgate released a set of character posters in November 2015, and The Guardian reported that the casting received a backlash on Twitter over the predominantly white cast. Some suggested that the casting of black actor Chadwick Boseman, who plays the god Thoth, played into the Magical Negro stereotype. The previous year, the biblical epic Exodus: Gods and Kings by director Ridley Scott received similar backlash for having a white cast. The Washington Post'''s Soraya Nadia McDonald also disparaged the casting practice for Gods of Egypt and said Lionsgate released the posters at an unfortunate time. She said with the release of Aziz Ansari's TV series Master of None in the previous week, "Whitewashed casting and the offensiveness of brownface has pretty much dominated the pop culture conversation this week. Promotion for the movie is beginning just as we're wrapping a banner year for discussions of diversity and gender pay equity in the film industry."

When Lionsgate followed its release of posters with a release of a theatrical trailer, Scott Mendelson at Forbes said, "The implication remains that white actors, even generic white actors with zero box office draw, are preferable in terms of domestic and overseas box office than culturally-specific (minority) actors who actually look like the people they are supposed to be playing." He said almost none of the actors, aside from potentially Butler, qualified as box office draws. BET's Evelyn Diaz said while Ridley Scott had defended his casting practice for Exodus by claiming the need to cast box office draws, "Gods of Egypt is headlined by character actors and Gerard Butler, none of whom will have people running to the theater on opening day." Deadlines Ross A. Lincoln said of the released trailer, "Casting here stands out like a sore thumb leftover from 1950s Hollywood. I suspect this film generates a lot of conversation before it hits theaters February 26, 2016."

In response to criticisms of its casting practice, director Alex Proyas and Lionsgate issued apologies in late November 2015 for not considering diversity; Lionsgate said it would strive to do better. Mendelson of Forbes said the apologies were "a somewhat different response" than defenses made by Ridley Scott for Exodus and Joe Wright for Pan (2015). Ava DuVernay, who directed Selma (2014), said, "This kind of apology never happens... for something that happens all the time. An unusual occurrence worth noting." The Guardians Ben Child said, "The apologies are remarkable, especially given that Gods of Egypt does not debut in cinemas until 26 February and could now suffer at the box office." Michael Ordoña of San Francisco Chronicle said of the apologies, "That's little comfort to the nonwhite actors denied opportunities or the Egyptians who will see a pale shadow of their ancestral traditions." The Casting Society of America applauded the statements from Lionsgate and Proyas. Professor Todd Boyd, chairman for the Study of Race and Popular Culture at the University of Southern California, said, "The apology is an attempt to have it both ways. They want the cast that they selected and they don't want people to hold it against them that it's a white cast."

Boseman, who plays the god Thoth, commenting on the whitewashing, said he expected the backlash to happen when he saw the script. He said, "I'm thankful that it did, because actually, I agree with it. That's why I wanted to do it, so you would see someone of African descent playing Thoth, the father of mathematics, astronomy, the god of wisdom." Actor Nikolaj Coster-Waldau said, "A lot of people are getting really worked up online about the fact that I'm a white actor. I'm not even playing an Egyptian; I'm an 8-foot-tall god who turns into a falcon. A part of me just wants to freak out, but then I think, 'There's nothing you can do about it.' You can't win in that sort of discussion."

In the month leading up to release, director Proyas said his film was fantasy and not intended to be history. He cited "creative license and artistic freedom of expression" to cast the actors he found to fit the roles. He said "white-washing" was a justified concern but for his fantasy film, "To exclude any one race in service of a hypothetical theory of historical accuracy ... would have been biased." Proyas said that films "need more people of color and a greater cultural diversity" but that Gods of Egypt "is not the best one to soap-box issues of diversity with". He argued that the lack of English-speaking Egyptian actors, production practicalities, the studio's requirement for box office draws, and Australia having guidelines limiting "imported" actors were all factors in casting for the film. He concluded, "I attempted to show racial diversity, black, white, Asian, as far as I was allowed, as far as I could, given the limitations I was given. It is obviously clear that for things to change, for casting in movies to become more diverse many forces must align. Not just the creative. To those who are offended by the decisions which were made I have already apologised. I respect their opinion, but I hope the context of the decisions is a little clearer based on my statements here." After the film was critically panned, Proyas said, "I guess I have the knack of rubbing reviewers the wrong way. This time of course they have bigger axes to grind – they can rip into my movie while trying to make their mainly pale asses look so politically correct by screaming 'white-wash!!!'"

Release

Marketing
Lionsgate spent an estimated  on marketing the film. It released a set of character posters in November 2015, for which it received backlash due to white actors playing Egyptian characters, as noted above. Later in the month, it released a theatrical trailer. Lionsgate aired a 60-second spot for Gods of Egypt during the pre-game show of the Super Bowl 50 on February 7, 2016, though they released the trailer online a day earlier.

In the week before the film's release, Lions released the tie-in mobile game Gods of Egypt: Secrets of the Lost Kingdom on iOS and Android.

Box office forecastBoxOffice forecast two months in advance that Gods of Egypt would gross  on its opening weekend in the United States and Canada, and that it would gross  total on its theatrical run. The magazine said the film had "a strong ensemble cast" and that its director has "had a noteworthy following". BoxOffice also said the premise could attract movie-goers who saw Clash of the Titans, Wrath of the Titans, and the Percy Jackson films. Admissions to 3D screenings would help boost Gods of Egypts gross. The magazine said factors negatively affecting the film's gross were a "lackluster reaction" to its marketing and the backlash to its predominantly white cast causing negative buzz. It anticipated that the film's release would be front-loaded (focused on profiting mainly from opening weekend) due to the poor buzz, its categorization as a fantasy film, and with London Has Fallen opening the following weekend.

Cunningham said the expected gross was low for the film's triple-digit budget as well as additional marketing costs. He said the film could attract Alex Proyas's fan base but that it had suffered "some negativity out there" due to the predominantly white casting as well as the film being perceived to have an "old-fashioned" feel. Exhibitor Relations senior media analyst Jeff Bock said the film "feels late" years after the release of 300 (2007) and Immortals (2011), and an earlier production and release would have been more advantageous. The Hollywood Reporters McClintock said "ancient epics" in recent years had not performed well at the box office, citing the 2014 films Hercules, The Legend of Hercules, and Pompeii.

Ryan Faughnder of the Los Angeles Times said in the week before the film's release that the expected opening weekend gross meant that Lionsgate's plans to make Gods of Egypt the first film in a new franchise were unlikely. Faughnder said the film would need to perform strongly in territories outside the United States and Canada for a sequel to be developed.

Theatrical runGods of Egypt grossed $31.2 million in the United States and Canada, and $119.6 million in other countries, for a worldwide total of $150.7 million against a production budget of $140 million. The Hollywood Reporter estimated the film lost the studio up to $90 million, when factoring together all expenses and revenues.

It was released in 2D, RealD 3D, and IMAX 3D. Lionsgate released the film in the United States and Canada on the weekend of February 26–28, as well as in 68 other markets, including Russia, South Korea, and Brazil. Jaguar Films released the film in the United Arab Emirates (February 25) and other countries in the Middle East under the title Kings of Egypt.

It grossed an estimated $800,000 in Thursday-night previews and $4.8 million on Friday, lowering the projected weekend gross to $11–13 million. It went on to gross $14.1 million in its opening weekend, finishing second at the box office behind Deadpool ($31.5 million). It competed with fellow newcomers Eddie the Eagle and Triple 9, as well as with Deadpool, which opened two weekends earlier. Opening-day audiences polled by CinemaScore gave the film an average grade of "B−" on an A+ to F scale. The Christian Science Monitors Molly Driscoll said the Gods of Egypts US release was during "a traditionally quiet time at the box office". Scott Mendelson of Forbes commented on supporting versus opposing a successful debut of the film, as "It's an example of a great wrong in modern Hollywood (whitewashing) while existing as a great right (an original fantasy from a gifted and visionary director) at the same time."

Outside North America, the film got a staggered release. In its opening weekend, it was number one across Central America, Eastern Europe and South East Asia. Top openings were in Russia ($4.3 million), Brazil ($1.9 million) and Philippines ($1.7 million).

Critical receptionGods of Egypt was panned by critics. On Rotten Tomatoes, the film has an approval rating of 15% based on 195 reviews, with an average rating of 3.7/10. Metacritic gives the film a score of 25 out of 100 based on 25 critics, indicating "generally unfavorable reviews".

Alonso Duralde of TheWrap wrote, "A mishmash of unconvincing visual effects and clumsy writing—not to mention another depiction of ancient Egypt in which the lead roles are almost all played by white folks—Gods of Egypt might have merited a so-bad-it's-good schadenfreude fanbase had it maintained the unintentional laughs of its first 10 minutes. Instead, it skids into dullness, thus negating the camp classic that it so often verges on becoming." Joycelyn Noveck of the Chicago Sun Times gave the film a half star out of four, writing, "It's obvious the filmmakers were gunning for a sequel here. But this bloated enterprise is so tiresome by the end, it seems more likely headed for a long rest somewhere in the cinematic afterlife." Ignatiy Vishnevetsky of The A.V. Club called Gods of Egypt "overlong and very silly," and said: "A treasure trove of gilded fantasy bric-a-brac and clashing accents, Proyas' sword-and-sandals space opera is a head above the likes of Wrath of the Titans, but it rapidly devolves into a tedious and repetitive succession of monster chases, booby traps, and temples that start to crumble at the last minute."

Jordan Hoffman of The Guardian said, "This is ridiculous. This is offensive. This shouldn't be, and I'm not going to say otherwise if you can't bring yourself to buy a ticket for this movie. But if you are on the fence you can always offset your karmic footprint with a donation to a charity, because this movie is a tremendous amount of fun." Olly Richards of Empire'' was heavily critical, calling the film a "catastrophe" and "the Dolly Parton of movies, without any of the knowing wit".

In response to the reviews, director Proyas posted to Facebook calling critics "diseased vultures pecking at the bones of a dying carcass", who were "trying to peck to the rhythm of the consensus. I applaud any film-goer who values their own opinion enough to not base it on what the pack-mentality says is good or bad."

Accolades

Home media
The film was released on May 31, 2016, on DVD and Blu-ray.

See also
 Horus#Conflict between Horus and Set
 List of fantasy films of the 2010s
 List of biggest box-office bombs
 Whitewashing in film

Notes

References

External links
 
 
 
 

2016 films
Australian action adventure films
2010s English-language films
2016 3D films
2010s action adventure films
2010s fantasy adventure films
American 3D films
American action adventure films
American fantasy adventure films
Australian fantasy adventure films
Films scored by Marco Beltrami
Films based on Egyptian mythology
Films directed by Alex Proyas
Films produced by Alex Proyas
Films set in ancient Egypt
Films shot in Sydney
Fratricide in fiction
Fiction about regicide
Films using motion capture
IMAX films
Films with screenplays by Matt Sazama and Burk Sharpless
Race-related controversies in film
Casting controversies in film
Summit Entertainment films
Lionsgate films
Demons in film
Films about deities
Religious epic films
Films produced by Basil Iwanyk
Thunder Road Films films
2010s American films
Horus
Hathor
Set (deity)
Ra
Osiris
Isis